The following articles contain lists of professional bodybuilders:

List of female professional bodybuilders
List of male professional bodybuilders
List of British bodybuilders
List of German bodybuilders